The Escucha Formation is a geological formation in La Rioja and Teruel provinces of northeastern Spain whose strata date back to the late Aptian to middle Albian stages of the  Early Cretaceous. Dinosaur remains are among the fossils that have been recovered from the formation.

The Escucha Formation comprises siltstones, mudstones, sandstones, coal, siltstones and amber, in which several fossil insects were found. The formation was deposited in a variety of continental to paralic (deltaic) environments.

Fossil content 
The Escucha Formation has provided the following fossils, among others:

Dinosaurs 

Other dinosaurs
 Allosauroidea indet.
 Iguanodontia indet.
 Titanosauriformes indet.

Reptiles
 Aragochersis lignitesta
 Toremys cassiopeia
 Trachydermochelys sp.
 Testudines indet.
 Anteophthalmosuchus escuchae
 Goniopholididae indet.
 Hulkepholis plotos

Fish
 Chondrichthyes indet.
 Osteichthyes indet.

Insects 

Other arthropods

 Alavia neli
 Archaelagonops alavensis
 Mesozygiella dunlopi
 Alavesiaphis margaritae
 Hispanocader lisae
 Alavametra popovi
 Iberovelia quisquilia
 Glaesivelia pulcherrima
 Gymnopollisthrips maior
 G. minor
 Manicapsocidus enigmaticus
 Archaeatropos alavensis
 Preempheria antiqua
 Empheropsocus arilloi
 E. margineglabrus
 Morazatermes krishnai
 Cantabritermes simplex
 Autrigonoforceps iberica
 Hispanelcana alavensis
 H. arilloi
 H. lopezvallei
 Libanophron sugaar
 Hippocoon basajauni
 Burmaphron iratxoak
 B. jentilak
 B. sorginak
 Tagsmiphron olentzero
 Elasmophron mari
 Ectenobythus iberiensis
 Liztor pilosus
 Cretepyris martini
 Zophepyris alavaensis
 Ampulicomorpha perialla
 Microcostaphron parvus
 Archephedrus stolamissus
 Protorhyssalopsis perrichoti
 Spathiopteryx alavarommopsis
 Serphites lamiak
 Aposerphites angustus
 Archaeromma hispanicum
 Galloromma alavaensis
 Alavaromma orchamum
 Tithonoscelio resinalis
 Bruescelio platycephalus
 Electroteleiopsis hebdomas
 Alavascelio delvallei
 Amissascelio temporarius
 Perimoscelio tyrbastes
 Perimoscelio confector
 Proterosceliopsis masneri
 Juxtascelio interitus
 Iberopria perialla
 Iberoevania roblesi
 Cretevania alonsoi
 Iberomaimetsha nihtmara
 Iberomaimetsha rasnitsyni
 Valaa delclosi
 Megalava truncata
 Eosyntexis parva
 Cretasonoma corinformibus
 Penarhytus tenebris
 Prosolierius parvus
 Cretakarenni hispanicus
 Rhizophtoma longus
 Darwinylus marcosi
 Mediumiuga sinespinis
 Archiaustroconops alavensis
 Leptoconops (Leptoconops) zherikhini
 Gerontodacus skalskii
 Chimeromyia alava
 Chimeromyina concilia
 Euliphora grimaldii
 Alavesia subiasi
 Tethepomima holomma
 Tethepomyia buruhandi
 Lysistrata emerita
 Hegalari minor
 Hegalari antzinako
 Alavamanota hispanica
 Allocotocera xavieri
 Cretohaplusia ortunoi
 Eltxo cretaceus
 Helius (Helius) alavensis
 Helius (Helius) spiralis
 Espanoderus barbarae
 Alavaraphidia imperterrita
 Baissoptera cretaceoelectra
 Cretokatianna bucculenta
 Sphyrotheciscus senectus
 Archeallacma dolichopoda
 Katiannasminthurus xenopygus
 Pseudosminthurides stoechus
 Burmisotoma spinulifera
 Protoisotoma autrigoniensis
 Proisotoma communis
 Proleptochelia tenuissima
 Electrotanais monolithus
 Alavatanais carabe
 Alavatanais margulisae
 Eurotanais terminator
 Spinomegops arcanus
 Strieremaeus minguezae
 Iberofoveopsis miguelesi
 Hispanothrips utrillensis
 Aragonitermes teruelensis
 Aragonimantis aenigma
 Mymaropsis turolensis
 Serphites silban
 Galloromma turolensis
 Alavaromma orchamum
 Cretevania rubusensis
 Cretevania alcalai
 Cretevania montoyai
 Actenobius magneoculus
 Arra legalovi
 Leptoconops (Leptoconops) zherikhini
 Atriculicoides sanjusti
 Atriculicoides hispanicus
 Gerontodacus skalskii
 Microphorites utrillensis
 Litoleptis fossilis
 Burmazelmira grimaldii
 Aragomantispa lacerata
 Spinomegops aragonensis
 Ametroproctus valeriae
 Cretaceobodes martinezae
 Trhypochthonius lopezvallei

Invertebrates
 Ostracoda indet.
 Bivalvia indet.
 Gastropoda indet.

Flora
 Pinophyta
 Angiospermae indet.

Correlation

See also 
 List of dinosaur-bearing rock formations
 Monte Grande Formation, Albian formation of the Cantabrian Basin
 Caranguejeira Conglomerate, Aptian to Cenomanian formation of the Lusitanian Basin
 Baltic, Burmese, Dominican and Mexican amber

References

Bibliography

Further reading 
 L. Alcalá, E. Espílez, L. Mampel, J. I. Kirkland, M. Ortiga, D. Rubio, A. González, D. Ayala, A. Cobos, R. Royo-Torres, F. Gascó and M. D. Pesquero. 2012. A new Lower Cretaceous vertebrate bonebed near Arino (Tereul, Aragon, Spain); found and managed in a joint collaboration between a mining company and a palaeontological park. Geoheritage 4:275-286
 J. I. Canudo, A. Cobos, C. Martín-Closas, X. Murelaga, X. Pereda-Suberbiola, R. Royo-Torres, J. I. Ruiz-Omeñaca and L. M. Sender. 2005. Sobre la presencia de dinosaurios ornitópodos en la Formación Escucha (Cretácico Inferior, Albiense): redescubierto “Iguanodon” en Utrillas (Teruel) [On the presence of ornithopod dinosaurs in the Escucha Formation (Lower Cretaceous, Albian): redescribing “Iguanodon” in Utrillas (Teruel)]. Fundamental 6:51-56
 E. Peñalver, D. A. Grimaldi, and X. Delclos. 2006. Early Cretaceous spider web with its prey. Science 312:1761

Geologic formations of Spain
Cretaceous Spain
Lower Cretaceous Series of Europe
Albian Stage
Aptian Stage
Siltstone formations
Mudstone formations
Sandstone formations
Coal formations
Coal in Spain
Formations
Deltaic deposits
Paleontology in Spain
Formations
Formations
Formations